Lenka Ficková (born 10 January 1982) is a Czech sprinter. She competed in the women's 4 × 400 metres relay at the 2000 Summer Olympics.

References

1982 births
Living people
Athletes (track and field) at the 2000 Summer Olympics
Czech female sprinters
Olympic athletes of the Czech Republic
Place of birth missing (living people)
Olympic female sprinters